The Pink House (Spanish: La casa rosada) is a 2017 Peruvian thriller drama film written and directed by Palito Ortega Matute. It premiered in March 2017 at the San Diego Latino Film Festival. It was released posthumously on May 3, 2018 in Peruvian cinemas. It is one of the most awarded Peruvian films of recent years. According to the director, it is the biggest movie he has been able to produce.

Synopsis 
The film tells the story of a family from Ayacucho during the internal armed conflict. The mother is murdered and the father, the university professor, Adrián Mendoza Torres, is accused of being part of the terrorist organization Shining Path, for this reason he is cruelly tortured in La Casa Rosada. His 9 and 10-year-old children and his family will begin their intense search, finding him dying in a desolate place surrounded by many dead. It is there that they manage to save his life. After a few weeks, the family flees the war to Lima. The story takes place in the 80s in Ayacucho, a place that concentrated most of the violence unleashed during the era of terrorism.

Cast 

 José Luis Adrianzen as Adrián Mendoza Torres, the teacher
 Ricardo Bromley as John of God
 Shantall Lozano as Maria del Carmen
 Camila Mac Lennan as Aunt Rosa
 Rodrigo Viaggio as The disturbed
 Kike Casterot as Squid 10
 Carlos Cano as Army Major
 Ramón García - Taxi Driver
 Christian Esquivel as Sinchi Manuel
 Jhonny Mendoza as Lieutenant
 Segundino Huamancusi as Artisan prisoner
 Oswaldo Salas as Flat soldier
 Nelba Acuña as Hiker 1

Background 
Palito Ortega Matute saw first-hand the facilities of "the pink house", a place where people accused of being part of Shining Path were tortured, when at the age of 16, while accompanying a university student, he was detained by the armed forces and he spent a month and a half in that place, near the Los Cabitos army barracks. He was able to leave here thanks to the fact that his family was able to prove his innocence and that they achieved influential contacts at that time.

Controversies 
Prior to its release, the film was subject to controversy. Congressman and Army Division General (r) Edwin Donayre alleged that the tape "denigrated the Armed Forces." The actress Karina Calmet was ridiculed after she described it via Twitter as an apology for terrorism. Due to the controversy, the film was withdrawn from several theaters. Despite this, the film remained on the billboard for seven weeks and the LUM presents it regularly as part of its memory strengthening activities.

Awards

References

External links 

 

2017 films
2017 thriller drama films
Peruvian thriller drama films
2010s Peruvian films

2010s Spanish-language films
Films set in Peru
Films shot in Peru
Films about terrorism
Films set in the 1970s